Wercklea is a genus of flowering plants in the family Malvaceae.

Species include:

 Wercklea cocleana (A. Robyns) Fryxell
 Wercklea ferox (Hook.f.) Fryxell
 Wercklea flavovirens Proctor
 Wercklea grandiflora Fryxell
 Wercklea hottensis (Helwig ex Urb.) Fryxell
 Wercklea intermedia Fryxell

References

 
Malvaceae genera
Taxonomy articles created by Polbot